The Battle of Aboukir is an oil-on-canvas painting executed in 1806 by the French artist Antoine-Jean Gros. It has the large dimensions of 578 by 968 cm. It is held at the Palace of Versailles.

History and description
The painting depicts the battle of Aboukir that took place on 25 July 1799, when the outnumbered French Army led by Napoleon was able to defeat the Ottoman Empire Army and their British allies in Egypt. At the center of the composition is the French general Joachim Murat, riding a white horse and holding high his sword, in a scene of bloody carnage near the sea. To his right, the Turkish pasha presents him with his sword as a sign of surrendering. In the background are a fortress and some ships on the sea.

The dramatism of the scene represents a radical departure of the way battles were depicted in neoclassical painting: it is already a romantic scene, and this and other paintings by Gros had a strong influence in the development of the work of fellow French painters Théodore Géricault and Eugène Delacroix.

The painting was commissioned from Gros by Joachim Murat, and executed in 1806. It was in the National Palace of Naples in 1808, and was bought by the Musée du Luxembourg in 1833. Siince 1835 it is part of the art collection of the Palace of Versailles. A small sketch for the painting is held at the Detroit Institute of Arts.

References

1806 paintings
Paintings by Antoine-Jean Gros
War paintings
Paintings in the collection of the Palace of Versailles